Guy Mongrain (born April 21, 1953) is a Canadian game show host and former reporter. He is mostly known to host several popular Quebec television games on the network TVA for the past 20 years.

Career
Mongrain started his media career as a news radio anchor in 1977 and made his television debut in 1981 he was a contributor to several shows on TVA including Midi Soleil, Bonjour matin and Samedi magazine. Mongrain hosted a quiz game for the first time in 1987 when hosting Quebec a la carte which has a quiz game related to Quebec tourism. He hosted the show for less than a year while it ended in 1988. Then he would later host Charivari for over four years until 1992. He would later host Fort Boyard from 1994 to 2001 as well as Vingt-et-un which lasted only one season. from 1993 to 2018, he is the host of the Loto-Québec televised lottery game La Poule aux œufs d'or.

For over 12 years from 1991 to 2004, he was also the host of the TVA morning show Salut, Bonjour! which included news, editorials, entertainment and various guests and special events.

He also had minor cameo appearances in several television series including Sous les jacquettes in 2005 and Taxi 0-22 in 2007.

References

External links
 

Canadian game show hosts
French Quebecers
Living people
People from Laval, Quebec
Canadian radio journalists
1953 births